The Zavolzhye Engine Factory (ZMZ) is a Russian automotive engine producer.

The plant was founded in April 1958 to provide GAZ with engines, in particular for its new  GAZ-21 Volga.

The factory's first product was a brand-new  OHV engine. The first engine was assembled 4 November 1959; by December 1968, ZMZ had produced one million units.

ZMZ became independent in 1961, and was bought by UAZ in 2001. It produces spare parts for many vehicles of Soviet origin, as well as for some Ford models.

References

Sources 
 Thompson, Andy. Cars of the Soviet Union. Somerset, UK: Haynes Publishing, 2008.

External links
 Official website

 
Sollers JSC
Diesel engine manufacturers
Marine engine manufacturers
Automotive companies of Russia
Companies based in Nizhny Novgorod Oblast
Companies listed on the Moscow Exchange
Engine manufacturers of Russia
Engine manufacturers of the Soviet Union